Easthampton High School is a public, coeducational secondary school, located in and serving the community of Easthampton, Massachusetts. The school is administrated by a principal, William Evans, who responds to the Easthampton Public Schools District Superintendent, Allison LeClair. 

The school was the subject of controversy in March 2017, when their disciplinary policies were investigated by the Massachusetts Attorney General for racial discrimination.

Demographics

References

Easthampton, Massachusetts
Education in Hampshire County, Massachusetts
Public high schools in Massachusetts